Cross Roads is a primarily commercial neighbourhood of Kingston, Jamaica. It is centered on the intersection of five major roads: Slipe Road, Half Way Tree Road, Old Hope Road, Caledonia Avenue and Marescaux Road.

It is perhaps the geographical centre of Kingston.

Amenities
Cross Roads Police Station. 
Cross Roads Bus Station - a major transport hub for buses and taxis. 
Cross Roads Post Office. 
Cross Roads Market. 
Carib 5 - a five-screen multiplex cinema since 1997 but originally a 1,750-seat facility designed by John Pike and opening in 1938. The exterior walls are original and retain their impressive 1930s styling.  
 The Nuttall Memorial Hospital.

References

Neighbourhoods in Kingston, Jamaica